Felix Warden Brown FRCP FRCPsych (10 April 1908–10 June 1972) was a prominent British psychiatrist.

Biography

Born in Heaton Chapel, Lancashire, on 10 June 1908, Felix Warden Brown was educated at Bedford School, at Keble College, Oxford, at the Royal London Hospital, where he qualified in Medicine in 1932, and at Johns Hopkins University, where he trained in psychiatry under Adolf Meyer. He began working at Guy's Hospital in 1936, and subsequently worked at the Charing Cross Hospital, before becoming Consultant Physician at the Royal Free Hospital.  His work in child, family and adolescent psychiatry was his major contribution for which he is best known. He was elected as a Fellow of the Royal College of Physicians in 1968.

Married to the actress Eileen Way, Felix Warden Brown died on 10 June 1972.

References

1908 births
1972 deaths
People educated at Bedford School
Alumni of Keble College, Oxford
Fellows of the Royal College of Physicians
Fellows of the Royal College of Psychiatrists
20th-century English medical doctors
English psychiatrists
British psychiatrists
Physicians of the Royal Free Hospital